Cepero is a surname. Notable people with the surname include:

Danny Cepero (born 1985), American soccer player
Greichaly Cepero (born 1981), American volleyball player
Jesús Selgas Cepero (born 1951), Cuban artist 
Julio Cepero (born 1953), Cuban soccer player
Olga Cepero (born 1975), Cuban triple jumper
Paco Cepero (born 1942), Spanish guitarist
Ricardo López Cepero, Puerto Rican politician